An oyster festival is a food festival centered on the oyster. There are a number of oyster festivals worldwide, including the following:

Australia
 The Brisbane Water Oyster Festival — Woy Woy, New South Wales
 Narooma, New South Wales — Narooma, New South Wales. The Narooma Oyster Festival showcases the renowned Sydney Rock Oysters grown in the region as well as other local produce. The multi-award winning event (Regional Tourism Awards) includes entertainment for young and old, oyster tasting, cooking demonstrations, shucking competitions, bars and music. The 2014 event, notably, attracted an influx of tourists from China and abroad, traveling to taste some of the world's finest Sydney Rock Oysters. The festival is organized by a sub committee of the Narooma Chamber of Commerce and dedicated local volunteers.
 Ceduna, South Australia — Ceduna, South Australia

Canada
 The Tyne Valley Oyster Festival, an annual festival in Tyne Valley, Prince Edward Island, featuring the Canadian Oyster Shucking Championship, the PEI Oyster Grading Championship, Miss Oyster Pearl Pageant, Best Decorated Oyster Box, Best Dressed Oyster Fisher, Oyster Suppers and More...
 Festival des Huitres in Maisonette, New Brunswick

Chile 

 Fiesta de la Ostra de Cardonal, in Pelluhue (Maule Region)

Croatia
 The Oyster Festival (Croatian: Fešta od kamenica), held every March in Ston, located at the south of isthmus of the Pelješac peninsula in southern part of Croatia, also known for production of high-quality wines and sea salt.

France
 La fête de l’huître, a July festival that takes place at Riec-sur-Belon, in the region of Brittany.
 Oyster festivals around Arcachon Bay: every year each municipality of the bay celebrate Arcachon oyster in its own way in the course of the summer.

Ireland

 Galway International Oyster Festival, is deemed the oldest international oyster festival in the world and takes place on the last weekend of September each year. Galway, on the west coast of Ireland is the only place in Ireland when you can get native flat Galway Oysters in natural wild oyster beds. The festival was created to celebrate the start of the native oyster season as they are only available when there is an 'r' in the month. The Galway International Oyster & Seafood Festival is held over 3 days with marquee events, live music, seafood trails, oyster hot spots, masquerade gala event and the highly competitive World Oyster Opening Championship.
 Ballylongford International Oyster Festival in Ballylongford, County Kerry, Ireland.

Singapore 
 The World Oyster Festival, an annual, month-long event hosted by Greenwood Fish Market in Singapore. During which, more than 20 types of oysters are imported from across the globe for patrons to enjoy at their restaurants. Usually celebrated throughout the month of July, the event has been held since 2012.

South Africa 
 The Knysna Oyster Festival, an annual winter festival held in Knysna, South Africa

Spain 
The north coast of Spain is home to numerous festivals whose main theme is the oyster.

 Festival Somos la Ostra, in Castropol (Asturias)
 Festa da Ostra de A Lanzada-Noalla, in Sanxenxo (Galicia)
 Festa da Ostra de Arcade, in Soutomaior (Galicia)
 Festa de l'Ostra de L'Ampolla (Catalonia)

United Kingdom

England 
Oyster Feast is an annual event in Colchester, Essex, England, held since the 14th century.  The modern feast has been held since 1845.
Whitstable Oyster Festival, a July Oyster Festival taking place in Whitstable, Kent, England.
Falmouth Oyster Festival held at Falmouth, Cornwall, England in October.
Woburn Oyster Festival held in Woburn, Bedfordshire, England in September.
Easton Oyster Festival held in Easton, Bristol, England in October or November since 2005. The festival had a hiatus in 2011-12 but is returning in November 2013.

Northern Ireland 
Hillsborough Oyster Festival in Hillsborough, County Down, Northern Ireland.

United States
 Amite Oyster Festival annual festival in Amite, Louisiana
 Arcata Bay Oyster Festival — annually celebrated in June on the plaza in Arcata, California
 Berks County Celtic Oyster Festival — Mohnton, Pennsylvania
  celebration in St. Michaels, MD falls the first Saturday in November and offers food, entertainment, vendors, educational opportunities, boat rides, hands-on oyster tonging all on the beautiful Miles River.
 Chincoteague Oyster Festival — Chincoteague, Virginia
 Florida Seafood Festival —  Apalachicola, Florida
 Lowcountry Oyster Festival — Charleston, South Carolina
 Milford Oyster Festival — an annual food and entertainment festival in Milford, Connecticut, since 1975.
 Norwalk Oyster Festival — an annual food and entertainment festival in Norwalk, Connecticut, since 1978.
 North Carolina Oyster Festival — Ocean Isle, NC
 Ostraval — Williamstown, MA, The annual April 30 farewell to oysters for the summer. 
 OysterFest — in Shelton, Washington
 The Oyster Festival — Oyster Bay, New York 
 The Oyster Whelm — Northern Berkshire County, Massachusetts, since 2017. 
 San Francisco Oyster Fest — San Francisco, California 
 San Diego OysterFest, San Diego CA 
 St. Mary's County Oyster Festival and U.S. National Oyster Shucking Contest — Leonardtown, Maryland   
 Oysterfest — Fulton, Texas
Ocean State Oyster Festival — Providence, Rhode Island
 Red Bank Guinness Oyster Festival, NJ held every September
 Urbanna Oyster Festival — Urbanna, Virginia, since 1957
 Wellfleet OysterFest — an annual festival in Wellfleet, Massachusetts (Cape Cod)
 Taste of Wrightsville Beach —  Wrightsville Beach, NC 
 Bluefield, West Virginia Shriner Patrol Annual Oyster Dinner every October since 1975.
 Hilton Head Oyster Festival — Hilton Head, SC

References 

 
Food and drink festivals